24 heures (literally "24 Hours") is a Swiss regional Swiss-French-language daily newspaper, published by Tamedia in Lausanne, Vaud. Founded in 1762 as a collection of announcements and official communications, it is the oldest newspaper in the world with uninterrupted publication.

Foundation and operations
24 heures was founded in 1762 by David Duret (1733–1803) as the Annonces et avis divers, a collection of announcements and classified ads like many at the time. The paper later became the Feuille d'avis de Lausanne, and integrated an independent news section on 16 December 1872. The paper adopted its current name a century later, in 1972.

Change of name
Since 25 February 2005, the newspaper has had four local editions, with sections for the specific area of the canton:

 Lausanne and area
 Nord Vaudois-Broye
 La Côte
 Riviera-Chablais

The Nord Vaudois-Broye and Riviera-Chablais editions replaced the newspapers La Presse Riviera-Chablais and La Presse Nord Vaudois.

The newspaper shares some of its content with the Tribune de Genève, Tamedia's local newspaper for the Canton of Geneva.

The 2006 circulation of 24 heures was 95,315 copies. As of 2017, the newspaper had a circulation of 55,147.

See also
 List of newspapers in Switzerland

References

External links 
 24heures.ch (in Swiss French), the newspaper's official website

1762 establishments in Europe
18th-century establishments in Switzerland
Daily newspapers published in Switzerland
French-language newspapers published in Switzerland
Mass media in Lausanne
Publications established in 1762